Peter Thomas Walker (born June 24, 1927) is an American film, stage and television actor. Born in Mineola, New York. He appeared in over 30 films and television programs, and was known for his appearance as Sam in the anthology television series The Twilight Zone in the episode "A World of Difference". Walker was also a performer at the Avondale Playhouse. He later worked as a photographer and sculptor.

He played the Narrator/Mysterious Man in the 1st National Tour of the musical Into the Woods.

Partial filmography 

Jeunes maries (1954) – Un G.I.
Paris Nights (1954)
If All the Guys in the World (1955) – JohnnyMadelon (1955) – Un AmericainMaigret dirige l'enquete (1956)Valerie (1957) – Herb GarthThe Wayward Girl (1957) – Tommy GrayUnder Fire (1957) – Lt. SarrisThe Four Housemen of the Apocalypse (1962) – Minor Role (uncredited)W (1974) – Prison OfficialThe Doctors (1980) – Edmund PowellThe Adventure of the Action Hunters (1986) – OliverAsa (1986) – TrooperIf Lucy Fell (1996) – Bag ManPostcards from Paradise Park'' (2000) – Dudley

References

External links 

Rotten Tomatoes profile

1927 births
Living people
People from Mineola, New York
Male actors from New York (state)
American male film actors
American male television actors
American male stage actors
American male soap opera actors
20th-century American male actors
American emigrants to France
French male film actors
20th-century French male actors
American photographers
American male sculptors